Division No. 6, Subd. E is an unorganized subdivision in northeastern Newfoundland, Newfoundland and Labrador, Canada. It is in Division No. 6.

According to the 2016 Statistics Canada Census:
Population: 194
% Change (2011-2016):  -10.2
Dwellings: 631
Area (km2): 2,309.6
Density (persons per km2): 0.1

Newfoundland and Labrador subdivisions